Lars Dahlqvist (October 26, 1935, Njurunda – November 10, 1969) was a Swedish nordic combined skier who competed in the 1960s. He finished eighth in the Nordic combined event at the 1960 Winter Olympics in Squaw Valley.

Dahlqvist was born and died in Njurunda.

External links
Olympic nordic combined results: 1948-64

1935 births
1969 deaths
People from Sundsvall Municipality
Nordic combined skiers at the 1960 Winter Olympics
Swedish male Nordic combined skiers
Sportspeople from Västernorrland County